BAA Training (the former Baltic Aviation Academy and a subsidiary of Avia Solutions Group) is an aviation training centre, headquartered in Vilnius, Lithuania and operating globally. Certified as an Approved Training Organization (ATO), BAA Training offers Fixed or Rotary wing Ab Initio, Type Rating, Cabin Crew, Ground Handling, Flight Dispatcher training including online training courses and has a capacity to prepare approximately 1,000 aviation professionals yearly. BAA Training clients come from 96 countries. Ab Initio school with its two flight bases in Spain and the fleet of 22 aircraft has over 200 students. Currently, BAA Training operates 8 full flight simulators (FFS): 4 FFS at training centre in Vilnius, Lithuania, 2 FFS in Hoh Chi Minh City, Vietnam, 1 FFS in Zhengzhou City in China, 2 FFS in Barcelona, Spain.  All in all, through the extensive network of 69+ FFS in 29+ locations, BAA Training is ready to provide aviation training worldwide for more than 14 aircraft types.

BAA Training Historical Timeline 

 2006 – Foundation of the academy
 The establishment of flyLAL Training Centre fully owned by flyLAL Group. The centre provided training for B737CL and SAAB 2000 pilots and cabin crew.
 2008 – First simulation training equipment 
 Acquisition of the first full flight simulator – Boeing 737 – deployed at the HQ of the academy.
 Installation of the Real Fire Fighting Trainer for Firefighting and Smoke training at the HQ of the academy
 2009 – Name Change 
 Due to the implementation of a new business strategy, the academy changes its name into Baltic Aviation Academy.
 2011 – Further expansion 
 Acquisition of the Airbus A320 full flight simulator installed at the premises of the academy in Vilnius. 
 Acquisition of the first Cessna 150 marks the inception of the Ab Initio Flight School.  
 Establishment of a new business line – SimHelp – complements the list of training services by dedicated simulator maintenance assistance and provision of spare parts.
 2013 – ATO under EASA requirements and expansion
 Aviation training centre Baltic Aviation Academy receives approved training organisation certificate under EASA. 
 FNPT trainer order for Ab Initio Flight School training.
 Foundation of MOMook – intelligent business management software, designed specifically for aviation training centres.
 2015 – Rebranding for the international expansion 
 Baltic Aviation Academy becomes BAA Training. 
 2016 – New opportunities for clients 
 Purchase of the Airbus A320 touch screen trainer allows to get better prepared for flight training on the full flight simulator and save time and costs for clients.  
 Initiation of the first Cadet Programme.
 BAA Training establishes Emblick competency centre, an internal Avia Solutions Group competency centre, which is open for other Lithuanian organisations.
 2017 – First helicopter cadet programme
 2018 – Acquisition of Door and Slide Trainer and expansion  
 Purchase of an Airbus A320 Door and Slide Trainer for cabin crew and pilot training.
 BAA Training announces the establishment of a new company in Vietnam.
 BAA Training opens a new flight base in Lleida-Alguaire International Airport.
Ab Initio flight school fleet reaches 17 aircraft
Acquisition and installation of Boeing 737 NG and Airbus A320 full flight simulators at the HQ of the academy
Signature of a Memorandum of Understanding with Henan Civil Aviation Development and Investment Company (HNCA) announcing the start of cooperation for Henan-based Joint Venture aviation training company in China.
2018 – Further development of training programs: Tapk Pilotu and first MPL training program
Establishment of Tapk pilotu – pilot training funding and integration to job market project for Lithuanian market.
Launch of the first MPL training program through signing the partnership agreement with Avion Express.
2019 – Continues global expansion and new major client for Cadet training
BAA Training announces plans to invest 60mln euros to the global FFS expansion
Partnership agreement for Cadet training with Turkish Airlines.
Joint Venture agreement with Henan Civil Aviation Development and Investment Company (HNCA).
The company opens training facility in Vietnam.

 2020 – Opening of a new training facility
BAA Training opens training facility in China.
 2021 – Wind of changes
The company opens a training facility in Spain.
 BAA Training establishes an MRO in Spain called Avia Repair Co.
 BAA Training secures €31 million financing for its global expansion.
 The company appoints Marijus Ravoitis as its new CEO.
BAA Training launches a new Boeing 737 MAX Type Rating Program. 
BAA Training starts virtual reality-based pilot training. 
BAA Training Vietnam signs long-term agreement with Bamboo Airways on full flight simulator leasing.
2022
BAA Training launches a new Pilot Training Program in cooperation with ENAC.
BAA Training Launches a wew Cadet Program with Airline Pilot Job Guarantee. 
BAA Training Vietnam starts long-term business partnership with Vietravel Airlines.
BAA Training signs contract to provide Air France with Airbus A320 Type Rating services.

Cadet Programmes 
Since 2016, BAA Training started actively working with Wizz Air, Turkish Airlines, SmartLynx, Avion Express, Lao Skyway airlines and BayViet aviation school on Cadet training solutions.

MPL Program 
In 2019 focusing on development of aviation professional competencies BAA Training launched its first Multi Pilot Crew Pilot License with partner-airline Avion Express.

Other courses include – Cabin Crew, Ground Handling, Flight Dispatcher, training including online training courses.

In addition to the training base in Vilnius, Lithuania, BAA Training provides Type rating training for 14+ types of aircraft in 69+ full flight simulators extended across 29+ locations in Europe, South Americas, Africa and Asia.

Training equipment

Global Expansion

BAA Training in Europe 
In 2018, BAA Training added a new flight base in Lleida-Alguaire International Airport in Spain to ensure all-year-round training for its students.

By the end of 2019, BAA Training operated 4 full-flight simulators in Vilnius: two Airbus A320, one Boeing 737 CL, and one Boeing 737 NG. However, due to the growing Ab Initio pilot-student number and global demand for pilots company announced about the plans to expand its fleet with six additional units in Europe and Asia.

In 2020 company announced the establishment of BAA Training Spain training centre near Barcelona-El Prat. It is designed to accommodate 7 full flight simulators in total. First 2 are scheduled to be ready for training by September 2020.

BAA Training in Vietnam 
In 2018, BAA Training has announced the establishment of a new company in Vietnam – BAA Training Vietnam which is to operate a training centre of 4 full flight simulators by 2023. In September 2019 BAA Training Vietnam received ATO certificate and started its operations in 2019 with the first Airbus A320 full flight simulator, while the second simulator is expected to start operation in February 2020.

BAA Training in China 
With Joint Venture signature with HNCA in 2019, BAA Training started the establishment of the six full flight simulator training centre, BAA Training China.The ceremony of groundbreaking marked the beginning of BAA Training China construction. BAA Training China opened in June 2020, operating first simulator from the August of 2020.

Supplementary business lines 
 In 2011, BAA Training established SimHelp, which is currently acts as FFS fleet maintenance and spare parts supply platform
 In 2013 company established MOMook - Intelligent business management software designed specifically for aviation training centers. Integrated into the daily operations of training centre MOMook allows conduct smart training resources and processes planning, control centralized information easy and fast, monitor the evaluation and progress of students’ progress and operate as a paperless training organization.
 In 2016 BAA Training established EAAP recognized pilot assessment and competency center Emblick. The main role of the Emblick is to assess candidates suitability for the pilot profession and BAA Training training programs, as well as certain competency and skills development.
 In 2018 established Establishment of Tapk pilotu – pilot training funding and integration to job market program for Lithuanian market. Current program provides pilot training along with is funding, as well as a start of airline pilot career.

References

Aviation schools
Organizations based in Vilnius
Educational organizations based in Lithuania